The Basketball Diaries is a 1995 American biographical crime drama film directed by Scott Kalvert and based on an autobiographical novel by the same name written by Jim Carroll. It tells the story of Carroll's teenage years as a promising high school basketball player and writer who develops an addiction to heroin. Distributed by New Line Cinema, The Basketball Diaries stars Leonardo DiCaprio as Carroll, along with Bruno Kirby, Lorraine Bracco, Ernie Hudson, Patrick McGaw, James Madio, Michael Imperioli, and Mark Wahlberg in supporting roles.

The Basketball Diaries premiered at the Sundance Film Festival on January 27, 1995. The film was widely released in theaters on April 21, 1995, to mixed reviews and grossed $2.4 million at the box office.

Plot
Teenager Jim Carroll is a drug-addicted high school basketball player who regularly gets into mischief with his friends Pedro, Mickey and Neutron on the streets of New York City and at school. Outside of basketball, Jim shows an artistic interest in writing; keeping his work in his journal while expressing his thoughts and creating poetry. 

Jim's best friend, Bobby, is dying of leukemia. Jim frequently visits him in the hospital. Later, after a trip to a strip show cut short by an annoyed Bobby, he dies, and Jim and his friends attend his funeral days later. Following the funeral, Jim and his friends go to the basketball court and reminisce about Bobby's life. Depressed over Bobby's death, Jim begins to use heroin.

At basketball practice, Jim's coach Swifty sees Jim in the bathroom showers when he takes a short break to get high, where he then gropes him, and offers to pay him for sex. Jim refuses and pushes Swifty headfirst into a wall. As Jim's frustrations with school and life grow over time, he imagines shooting his classmates. The next day, before a game, Jim, Pedro, and Mickey take pills from Pedro's hat, hoping they are uppers. Neutron refuses the pills and confronts Jim about his growing habit. The pills are downers, and they cause the boys to perform disastrously during the game. A teacher who notices the boys engaging in drug use tells Jim and Mickey that they are suspended for a week, while Swifty tells Jim that he is now banned from playing basketball for his school again. Jim and Mickey, in response, resign from the team and drop out of school, while Neutron stays on.

After exposing his stash of drugs, Jim's religious mother disowns him and exiles a depressed Jim out of their apartment. Jim, Mickey, and Pedro from then on only live for their next score as homeless addicts; one later excursion has them break into a candy shop for money. Mickey finds a gun in the cash register and takes it. Hearing sirens, Jim and Mickey escape, but Pedro, too high and hungover to realize the situation, is left behind and arrested. Jim continues a desperate life of shady dealings and getting high with Mickey, and by the coming winter, passes out in the snow high on heroin. Jim's friend Reggie, who sympathizes with Jim over his predicament having been in a similar situation, finds him, takes him to his apartment, and forces him to detox, but Jim relapses.

Back on the street, Jim is desperate for more drugs and resorts to prostituting himself at a public restroom. Later, Jim and Mickey buy heroin, but discover that the dealer ripped them off. Enraged, Mickey corners the dealer on the roof of an apartment building. He accidentally pushes him off the roof to his death. Mickey tries to escape, but is beaten by a gang and then arrested; he is later tried as an adult and convicted. After escaping, with nowhere else to go, Jim returns to his mother’s apartment and she reports him to the police. Jim is arrested, convicted, and sentenced to six months' incarceration at Rikers Island for assault, robbery, resisting arrest, and possession of narcotics. There, he spends the time in jail getting clean.

Six months later, Jim approaches a stage door to give a poetry reading. He encounters Pedro, who has been released from reform school. Pedro offers him a bag of drugs, which Jim refuses. Jim later recites his work before an audience and receives applause.

Cast

 Leonardo DiCaprio as Jim Carroll
 Lorraine Bracco as Mrs. Carroll
 Marilyn Sokol as Chanting Woman
 James Madio as Pedro
 Patrick McGaw as Neutron
 Mark Wahlberg as Mickey
 Roy Cooper as Father McNulty
 Bruno Kirby as Swifty
 Alexander Chaplin as Bobo
 Juliette Lewis as Diane Moody
 Michael Imperioli as Bobby
 Michael Rapaport as Skinhead
 Ernie Hudson as Reggie
 Manny Alfaro as Manny
 Cynthia Daniel as Winkie
 Brittany Daniel as Blinkie
 Jim Carroll as Frankie Pinewater
 Ben Jorgensen as Tommy

Reception
On review aggregator website Rotten Tomatoes, the film holds an approval rating of 47% based on 43 reviews and with an average rating of 5.3/10. The websites critical consensus states "In spite of its young leading man's heroic efforts to hold it all together, a muddled message prevents The Basketball Diaries from compelling as a cautionary tale." Metacritic gave the movie a score of 46 based in 19 reviews, indicating "mixed or average reviews".

Roger Ebert gave the film two stars out of four. Ebert remarked: "At the end, Jim is seen going in through a 'stage door' and then we hear him telling the story of his descent and recovery. We can't tell if this is supposed to be genuine testimony or a performance. That's the problem with the whole movie."

Lawsuits
The film became controversial in the aftermath of the 1997 Heath High School shooting and the 1999 Columbine High School massacre. Critics noted similarities between those shooting attacks and a dream sequence in the film in which the protagonist (Leonardo DiCaprio) wears a black trenchcoat and shoots six students in his school classroom. The film has been named in lawsuits brought by the relatives of murder victims. In 1999, activist Jack Thompson filed a $33 million lawsuit claiming that the film's plot (along with two internet pornography sites, several computer game companies, and makers and distributors of the 1994 film Natural Born Killers) caused the Heath High School shooting. The case was dismissed in 2001.

Soundtrack
The Basketball Diaries soundtrack was released in 1995 by PolyGram to accompany the film, featuring songs from Pearl Jam and PJ Harvey. AllMusic rated it three stars out of five.

References

External links

 
 
 
 
 

1995 crime drama films
1995 directorial debut films
1995 films
1995 independent films
1990s biographical drama films
1990s coming-of-age drama films
1990s English-language films
1990s teen drama films
American basketball films
American biographical drama films
American coming-of-age drama films
American crime drama films
American independent films
American sports drama films
American teen drama films
Biographical films about children
Biographical films about writers
Crime films based on actual events
Drama films based on actual events
Films about heroin addiction
Films based on autobiographies
Films scored by Graeme Revell
Films set in New York City
Films shot in New Jersey
Films shot in New York City
Films about mother–son relationships
New Line Cinema films
1990s American films
English-language crime drama films